Pirtala railway station is an Indian railway station of the Lalgola-Sealdah branch lines in the Eastern Railway zone of Indian Railways. The station is situated at Pirtala in Murshidabad district in the Indian state of West Bengal. The railway station serves Pirtala village and the surrounding area. A total of 11 trains including Lalgola Passengers and few EMU trains stop at this station.

Electrification
The Krishnanagar– Section, including the Pirtala railway station, was electrified in 2004. The section was turned into a double-tracked line when a new track was added alongside the previous one in 2010.

References

Railway stations in Murshidabad district
Sealdah railway division
Kolkata Suburban Railway stations